Ionuţ Alexandru Mitrea (born 18 January 1990 in Bucharest) is a Romanian sprint canoeist. Mitrea is a member of the canoe and kayak team for Dynamo Bucharest Sports Club, and is coached and trained by Serban Romica.

Mitrea qualified for the men's K-2 200 metres at the 2012 Summer Olympics in London, by finishing fourth from the 2011 ICF Canoe Sprint World Championships in Szeged, Hungary. Mitrea and his partner Bogdan Mada paddled to a fifth-place finish and thirteenth overall in the B-final by approximately ten seconds behind the Belgian pair Olivier Cauwenbergh and Laurens Pannecoucke, recording their slowest time of 46.495 seconds.

References

External links
NBC Olympics Profile

1990 births
Romanian male canoeists
Living people
Olympic canoeists of Romania
Canoeists at the 2012 Summer Olympics
Sportspeople from Bucharest